James Michael Hamilton (born 9 December 1966) was a Scottish footballer who played for Arbroath, Stirling Albion, Dumbarton, Forfar Athletic and Albion Rovers.

References

1966 births
Scottish footballers
Dumbarton F.C. players
Arbroath F.C. players
Stirling Albion F.C. players
Forfar Athletic F.C. players
Albion Rovers F.C. players
Scottish Football League players
Living people
Association football defenders